SM U-120 was a Type UE II long-range minelayer submarine of the Imperial German Navy. She was built at Hamburg, Germany, by Aktiengesellschaft Vulcan and launched on 20 June 1918. She was commissioned in the Imperial German Navy on 31 August 1918 with Kapitänleutnant Hans von Mellenthin in command. She had a short-lived career, not being assigned to any flotillas, nor achieving any successful attacks on enemy shipping, before the end of the First World War. She was surrendered to Italy on 22 November 1918, and was broken up in April 1919 at La Spezia.

Design
German Type UE II submarines were preceded by the shorter Type UE I submarines. U-120 had a displacement of  when at the surface and  while submerged. The submarine was powered by two  engines for use while surfaced, and two  engines for use while submerged. She had two shafts and two  propellers.

U-120 was fitted with four  torpedo tubes (fitted at its bow), fourteen torpedoes, two  mine chutes (fitted at its stern), forty-two mines, one  SK L/45 deck gun, and 494 rounds. She had a complement of forty (thirty-six crew members and four officers).

References

Notes

Citations

Bibliography

German Type UE II submarines
Ships built in Hamburg
1918 ships
U-boats commissioned in 1918
World War I submarines of Germany